The Aquaverium is a permanent Watersport Exhibition, located in Grou, Friesland. It offers 10.000 m² of floorspace to Watersports related companies for showing their products to the public. There is no entrance fee.

References

External links
 Official website

Buildings and structures in Friesland